Barcelona Esportivo Capela, commonly referred to as Barcelona Capela, is a football club based in the Socorro district of São Paulo, Brazil. 

The club was responsible to serve as the youth setup for notable players, such as Renato Abreu, Pará, Igor Rocha and mainly Diego Costa.

References

External links
 
FPF team profile 

Association football clubs established in 2004
Football clubs in São Paulo (state)
2004 establishments in Brazil